The  was the ninth-oldest branch of the Japanese Imperial Family, created from branches of the Fushimi-no-miya house.

Higashikuni-no-miya 

The Higashikuni-no-miya house was formed by Prince Naruhiko, ninth son of Prince Kuni Asahiko.

Prince Higashikuni Nobuhiko became simply Higashikuni Nobuhiko after the abolition of the Japanese aristocracy during the American occupation of Japan in 1947.

References